The gamification of learning is an educational approach that seeks to motivate students by using video game design and game elements in learning environments. The goal is to maximize enjoyment and engagement by capturing the interest of learners and inspiring them to continue learning. Gamification, broadly defined, is the process of defining the elements which comprise games, make those games fun, and motivate players to continue playing, then using those same elements in a non-game context to influence behavior. In other words, gamification is the introduction of game elements into a traditionally non-game situation.

There are two forms of gamification: structural, which means no changes to subject matter, and the altered content method that adds subject matter. Games applied in learning can be considered serious games, or games where the learning experience is centered around serious stories. A serious story needs to be both "impressive in quality" and "part of a thoughtful process" to achieve learning goals.

In educational contexts, examples of desired student behavior as a result of gamification include attending class, focusing on meaningful learning tasks, and taking initiative.

Gamification of learning does not involve students in designing and creating their own games or in playing commercially produced video games, making it distinguishable from game-based learning, or using educational games to learn a concept. Within game-based learning initiatives, students might use Gamestar Mechanic or GameMaker to create their own video game or explore and create 3D worlds in Minecraft. In these examples, the learning agenda is encompassed within the game itself.

Some authors contrast gamification of learning with game-based learning. They claim that gamification occurs only when learning happens in a non-game context, such as a school classroom. Under this classification, when a series of game elements is arranged into a "game layer," or a system which operates in coordination with learning in regular classrooms, then gamification of learning occurs. Other examples of gamified content include games that are created to induce learning.

Game elements that can facilitate learning 
Some elements of games that may be used to motivate learners and facilitate learning include:
 Progress mechanics (points/badges/leaderboards, or PBL's)
 Narrative and characters 
 Player control
 Immediate feedback
 Opportunities for collaborative problem solving
 Scaffolded learning with increasing challenges
 Opportunities for mastery, and leveling up
 Social connection

A more complete taxonomy of game elements used in educational contexts divide 21 game elements into five dimensions

When a classroom incorporates the use of some of these elements, that environment can be considered "gamified". There is no distinction as to how many elements need to be included to officially constitute gamification, but a guiding principle is that gamification takes into consideration the complex system of reasons a person chooses to act, and not just one single factor. Progress mechanics, which need not make use of advanced technology, are often thought of as constituting a gamified system However, used in isolation, these points and opportunities to earn achievements are not necessarily effective motivators for learning. Engaging video games which can keep players playing for hours on end do not maintain players' interest by simply offering the ability to earn points and beat levels. Rather, the story that carries players along, the chances for players to connect and collaborate with others, the immediate feedback, the increasing challenges, and the powerful choices given to players about how to proceed throughout the game, are immensely significant factors in sustained engagement. Business initiatives designed to use gamification to retain and recruit customers, but do not incorporate a creative and balanced approach to combining game elements, may be destined to fail. Similarly, in learning contexts, the unique needs of each set of learners, along with the specific learning objectives relevant to that context must inform the combination of game elements to shape a compelling gamification system that has the potential to motivate learners.

A system of game elements which operates in the classroom is explicit, and consciously experienced by the students in the classroom. There is no hidden agenda by which teachers attempt to coerce or trick students into doing something. Students still make autonomous choices to participate in learning activities. The progress mechanics used in the gamified system can be thought of as lighting the way for learners as they progress, and the other game mechanics and elements of game design are set up as an immersive system to support and maximize students' learning.

Benefits 
Gamification initiatives in learning contexts acknowledge that large numbers of school-aged children play video games, which shapes their identity as people and as learners. While the world of gaming used to be skewed heavily toward male players, recent statistics show that slightly more than half of videogame players are male: in the United States, 59% male, 41% female, and  52% male, 48% female in Canada. Within games and other digital media, students experience opportunities for autonomy, competence and relatedness, and these affordances are what they have come to expect from such environments. Providing these same opportunities in the classroom environment is a way to acknowledge students' reality, and to acknowledge that this reality affects who they are as learners. Incorporating elements from games into classroom scenarios is a way to provide students with opportunities to act autonomously, to display competence, and to learn in relationship to others. Game elements are a familiar language that children speak, and an additional channel through which teachers can communicate with their students.

Game designer Jane McGonigal characterizes video game players as urgent optimists who are part of a social fabric, engaged in blissful productivity, and on the lookout for epic meaning. If teachers can successfully organize their classrooms and curriculum activities to incorporate the elements of games which facilitate such confidence, purpose and integrated sense of mission, students may become engrossed in learning and collaborating such that they do not want to stop. The dynamic combination of intrinsic and extrinsic motivators is a powerful force which, if educational contexts can adapt from video games, may increase student motivation, and student learning.

Some of the potential benefits of successful gamification initiatives in the classroom include: 
 giving students ownership of their learning
 opportunities for identity work through taking on alternate selves
 freedom to fail and try again without negative repercussions
 chances to increase fun and joy in the classroom
 opportunities for differentiated instruction
 making learning visible
 providing a manageable set of subtasks and tasks 
 inspiring students to discover intrinsic motivators for learning

Referring to how video games provide increasingly difficult challenges to players, game designer Amy Jo Kim has suggested that every educational scenario could be set up to operate this way. This game mechanic which involves tracking players' learning in the game, and responding by raising the difficulty level of tasks at just the right moment, keeps players from becoming unnecessarily frustrated with tasks that are too difficult, as well as keeps players from becoming bored with tasks that are too easy. This pacing fosters continued engagement and interest which can mean that learners are focused on educational tasks, and may get into a state of flow, or deeply absorbed in learning.

In gamified e-learning platforms, massive amount of data are generated as a result of user interaction and action within the system. These actions and interactions can be properly sampled, recorded, and analyzed. Meaningful insights on performance behaviors and learning objectives can be useful to teachers, learners, and application developers to improve the learning. These insights can be in form of a quick feedback to learners on the learning objectives while the learner still operates within the rules of play. Data generated from games can also be used to uncover patterns and rules to improve the gamified e-learning experience.

In a large systematic review of the literature regarding the application of gamification in Higher Education benefits where identified such as positive effects in student engagement, attitude, performance, and enjoyment although these are mediated by the context and design.

Application 
Three key ways in which a classroom, course, or unit can be gamified are through changing the language, adapting the grading process, and modifying the structure of the learning environment. With regard to language, instead of referring to academic requirements with the typical associated terms, game-like names may be used instead. For example, making a course presentation might be referred to as "embarking on a quest", writing an exam might be "defeating monsters", and creating a prototype might be classed as "completing a mission". In terms of grading, the grading scheme for a course might be adapted to make use of Experience points (XP) as opposed to letter grades. Each student can begin at level one with zero points; as they progress through the course, completing missions and demonstrating learning, they earn XP. A chart can be developed to illustrate how many XP is required to earn a letter grade. For example, earning 1500 XP might translate to a C, while 2000 would earn a B, and 2500, an A. Some teachers use XP, as well as health points (HP) and knowledge points (KP) to motivate students in the classroom, but do not connect these points with the letter grades students get on a report card. Instead these points are connected with earning virtual rewards such as badges or trophies.

The structure of a course or unit may be adapted in various ways to incorporate elements of gamification; these adaptations can affect the role of the student, the role of the teacher, and role of the learning environment. The role of a student in a gamified environment might be to adopt an avatar and a game name with which they navigate through their learning tasks. Students may be organized into teams or guilds, and be invited to embark on learning quests with their fellow guild members. They may be encouraged to help other guild members, as well as those in other guilds, if they have mastered a learning task ahead of others. Students tend to express themselves as one of the following game-player types; player (motivated by extrinsic rewards), socialiser (motivated by relatedness), free spirit (motivated by autonomy), achiever (motivated by mastery) and philanthropist (motivated by purpose). The role of the teacher is to design a gamified application, embedding game dynamics and mechanics that appeal to the target group (i.e. students) and provide the type of rewards that are attractive to the motivation of the majority. Therefore, it is important teachers know their students so they are able to best design a gamififed program that not only interests the students but also one in which matches the specific learning goals that hit on elements of knowledge from the curriculum. The teacher also needs to responsibly track student achievements with a web-based platform, such as Open Badges, the WordPress plug-in GameOn or an online spreadsheet. The teacher may also publish a leaderboard online which illustrates the students who have earned the most XP, or reached the highest level of play. The teacher may define the parameters of the classroom "game", giving the ultimate learning goal a name, defining the learning tasks which make up the unit or the course, and specifying the rewards for completing those tasks. The other important role of the teacher is to provide encouragement and guidance for students as they navigate the gamified environment.

The role of a gamified learning environment may be structured to provide an overarching narrative which functions as a context for all the learning activities. For example, a narrative might involve an impending zombie attack which can be fended off or a murder mystery which can be solved, ultimately, through the process of learning. Learning is the focus of each gamified system. Sometimes the narrative is related to the content being learned, for example, in the case of a disease outbreak which can be stopped through learning biology. In some cases the narrative is unrelated, as in a case of music students who learn to play pieces as the means to collectively climb up to the top of a mountain, experiencing various challenges and setbacks along the way. Other ways in which gaming elements are part of the role of the learning environment include theme music played at opportune times, a continuous feedback loop which, if not instantaneous, is as quick as possible, a variety of individual and collaborative challenges, and the provision of choice as to which learning activities are undertaken, how they will be undertaken, or in which order they will be undertaken.

History 
Without adding extra gaming elements to the classroom, schooling already contains some elements which are analogous to games.  Since the 1700s, school has presented opportunities for students to earn marks for handing in assignments and completing exams, which are a form of reward points. Since the early 1900s, with the advent of psychoanalytic theory, reward management programs were developed and can still be seen in schools. For example, many teachers set up reward programs in their classrooms which allow students to earn free time, school supplies or treats for finishing homework or following classroom rules.

Teaching machines with gamification features were developed by cyberneticist Gordon Pask from 1956 onwards, after he was granted a patent for an "Apparatus for assisting an operator in performing a skill". Based on this patent, Pask and Robin McKinnon-Wood built SAKI – the Self-Adaptive Keyboard Instructor – for  teaching students how to use the Hollerith key punch, a data entry device using punched cards. The punched card was common until the 1970s and there was huge demand for skilled operators. SAKI treats the student as a "black box", building a probabilistic model of their performance as it goes. The machine stores the response times for different exercises, repeating exercises for which the operator has the slowest average response time, and increasing the difficulty of exercises where the operator has performed successfully. SAKI could train an expert key-punch operator in four to six weeks, a reduction of between 30 and 50 percent over other methods. "Ideally, for an operator to perform a skill efficiently, the data presented to him should always be of sufficient complexity to maintain his interest and maintain a competitive situation, but not so complex as to discourage the operator". SAKI led to the development of teaching software such as the Mavis Beacon typing tutor, fondly remembered by students of touch-typing everywhere.

While some have criticized the term "gamification" then, as simply a new name for a practice that has been used in education for many years, gamification does not refer to a one-dimensional system where a reward is offered for performing a certain behaviour. The gamification of learning is an approach which recently has evolved, in coordination with technological developments, to include much larger scales for gameplay, new tools, and new ways to connect people. The term gamification, coined in 2002, is not a one-dimensional reward system. Rather, it takes into consideration the variety of complex factors which make a person decide to do something; it is a multifaceted approach which takes into consideration psychology, design, strategy, and technology. One reason for the popularization of the term "gamification" is that current advancements in technology, in particular, mobile technology have allowed for the explosion of a variety of gamification initiatives in many contexts. Some of these contexts include the Starbucks and Shoppers Drug Mart loyalty programs, location-based check-in applications such as Foursquare, and mobile and web applications and tools that reward and broadcast healthy eating, drinking, and exercise habits, such as Fitocracy, BACtrack and Fitbit. These examples involve the use of game elements such as points, badges and leaderboards to motivate behavioural changes and track those changes in online platforms. The gamification of learning is related to these popular initiatives, but specifically focuses on the use of game elements to facilitate student engagement and motivation to learn. It is difficult to pinpoint when gamification, in the strict sense of the term, came to be used in educational contexts, although examples shared online by classroom teachers begin appearing in 2010.

Effectiveness 
The research of Domínguez and colleagues about gamifying learning experiences suggests that common beliefs about the benefits obtained when using games in education can be challenged. Students who completed the gamified experience got better scores in practical assignments and in overall score, but their findings also suggest that these students performed poorly on written assignments and participated less on class activities, although their initial motivation was higher. The researchers concluded that gamification in e-learning platforms seems to have the potential to increase student motivation, but that it is not trivial to achieve that effect, as a big effort is required in the design and implementation of the experience for it to be fully motivating for participants. On the one hand, qualitative analysis of the study suggests that gamification can have a great emotional and social impact on students, as reward systems and competitive social mechanisms seem to be motivating for them. But quantitative analysis suggests that the cognitive impact of gamification on students is not very significant. Students who followed traditional exercises performed similarly in overall score than those who followed gamified exercises. Disadvantages of gamified learning were reported by 57 students who did not want to participate in the gamified experience. The most frequent reason argued by students was 'time availability'. The second most important reason were technical problems. Other reasons were that there were too many students and that they had to visit so many web pages and applications at the university that they did not want to use a new one.

Another field where serious games are used to improve learning is health care. Petit dit Dariel, Raby, Ravaut and Rothan-Tondeur investigated the developing of serious games potential in nursing education. They suggest that few nursing students have long-term exposure to home-care and community situations. New pedagogical tools are needed to adequately and consistently prepare nurses for the skills they will need to care for patients outside acute care settings. Advances in information and communications technologies offer an opportunity to explore innovative pedagogical solutions that could help students develop these skills in a safe environment. Laboratory simulations with high fidelity mannequins, for example, have become an integral element in many health care curricula. A recent systematic review found evidence suggesting that the use of simulation mannequins significantly improved three outcomes integral to clinical reasoning: knowledge acquisition, critical thinking and the ability to identify deteriorating patients.

In the study of Mouaheb, Fahli, Moussetad and Eljamali an American version of a serious game was investigated: Virtual University. Results showed that learning using this serious game has educational values that are based on learning concepts advocated by constructivist psycho-cognitive theories. It guarantees intrinsic motivation, generates cognitive conflicts and provides situated learning. The use of Virtual University allowed the researchers to identify the following key points: from its playfulness combined with video game technologies, the tool was able to motivate learners intrinsically; the simulation game also recreates learning situations extremely close to that of reality, especially considering the complexity, dynamism and all of the interrelations and interactions that exist within the university system. This is a major educational advantage by encouraging 1) an intense interaction that generates real cognitive or socio-cognitive conflicts, providing a solid construction of knowledge; 2) an autonomy in the learning process following a strong metacognitive activity; 3) an eventual transfer of acquired skills.

In another study involving an American-based school,  gamification was integrated into all its subjects. Both students and teachers indicated they derived maximum satisfaction from a gamified form of learning. However, results from standardized tests showed a slightly improved performance, and in some cases, below-average performance in comparison to other schools. Enough evidence-based research needs to be carried out to objectively measure the effectiveness of gamification of learning across varying factors.

Legal restrictions 
Multiple legal restrictions may apply to the gamification of learning because of the difference in laws in different countries and states. However, there are common laws prevalent in most jurisdictions.

Administrators and instructors must ensure the privacy rights of learners are protected. The use of Personally Identifiable Information(PII) of learners and other user-generated data should be clearly stated in a privacy policy made available to all learners.

Gamified e-learning systems can make use of existing game elements such as avatars and badges. Educators should be aware of the copyright protection guiding the use of such elements and ensure they are not in violation. Permission should be obtained from the creators of existing game items under copyright protection. In some cases, educators can create their game elements for use in such gamified e-learning systems.

LeapFrog hacking controversy 
LeapFrog, a corporation which manufactures e-learning toys, smart toys and games for children, was the subject of a hacking scandal involving its product LeapPad Ultimate, a rugged gaming and e-learning tablet featuring educational games for young users. The tablet had security errors that allowed third-parties to message users, scrape personal information from users and get into the WiFi networks of users, most of whom were minors. This led to concerns regarding pedophiles using the tablets as a way to groom potential victims.

Criticism 
Gamification of learning has been criticized for its use of extrinsic motivators, which some teachers believe must be avoided since they have the potential to decrease intrinsic motivation for learning (see overjustification). This idea is based on research which emerged first in the early 1970s and has been recently made popular by Daniel Pink.

Some teachers may criticize gamification for taking a less than serious approach to education. This may be a result of the historical distinction between work and play which perpetuates the notion that the classroom cannot be a place for games, or a place for fun. Gameplay in some views may be seen as being easy, irrelevant to learning, and applicable only to very young children.

Teachers who criticize the gamification of learning might feel that it is not worth their time to implement gaming initiatives, either because they themselves are stretched thin with the number of responsibilities that they already have, or because they fear that the curriculum might not be covered if any time is spent dedicated to anything other than engagement with that curriculum. Gamification of learning has been also criticized as ineffective for certain learners and for certain situations.. Videogame theorist Ian Bogost has criticized gamification for its tendency to take a simplistic, manipulative approach which does not reflect the real quality of complex, motivational games. Educational scenarios which purport to be gamification, but only make use of progress mechanics such as points, badges and leaderboards are particularly susceptible to such criticism. 

Gamification in education has also raised concerns over inequity in the classroom. A lack of access to technology, students who do not like gaming, and students in large schools where the teachers do not know each student on an individual level may affect any educational benefit to come from gamification, and gamification may not be appropriate for every subject in school. For example, sensitive or controversial subject matter such as racial history or human rights may not be an appropriate space for gamification.

There are growing concerns about ethical constraints surrounding implementation of gamification using ICT tools and e-learning systems. Gaming elements, like points and badges, can encourage collaboration and social competition but can also encourage aggression amongst learners. More so, the policies guiding the privacy and security of data produced in gamified e-learning systems needs to be transparent to all stakeholders including students and administrators. Teachers and students need to be aware and accept to participate in any gamified form of learning introduced in the curriculum. Any possible risks that may arise should be made available to all participants prior to their participation. Also, Educators should have an understanding of the target audience of the learners to maintain fairness. Educators need to ensure gaming elements and rules integrated in gamification design do not impair learners' participation because of their social, cultural or physical conditions.

See also 
 Educational game
 Game studies
 Gamification
 Incentive-centered design

References 

Teaching
Gaming
Learning
Gamification
Educational technology